The NORCECA Women's Junior Continental Championship U-20 is a volleyball competition for national teams, currently held biannually and organized by the NORCECA, the North America, Central America and Caribbean volleyball federation. The competition is played by women's under-20 teams.

History

Medal table

See also
Men's Junior NORCECA Volleyball Championship

NORCECA Volleyball Championship
Women's NORCECA Volleyball Championship
V